The 2019 Nigerian Senate election in Ekiti State held on February 23, 2019, to elect members of the Nigerian Senate to represent Ekiti State. Michael Opeyemi Bamidele representing Ekiti Central, Adetumbi Olubunmi representing Ekiti North and Adebayo Clement Adeyeye representing Ekiti South all won on the platform of All Progressives Congress; however, Adeyeye's win was later overturned, and the seat awarded to PDP incumbent Abiodun Olujimi.

Overview

Summary

Results

Ekiti Central 
A total of 10 candidates registered with the Independent National Electoral Commission to contest in the election. APC candidate Michael Bamidele won the election, defeating PDP candidate Obafemi Adewale and 8 other party candidates. Michael Bamidele received 65.36% of the votes, while Obafemi Adewale received 33.76%.

Ekiti North 
A total of 8 candidates registered with the Independent National Electoral Commission to contest in the election. APC candidate Adetumbi Olubunmi won the election, defeating PDP candidate Duro Faseyi and 6 other party candidates. Adetumbi Olubunmi received 54.67% of the votes, while Duro Faseyi received 44.33%.

Ekiti South 
A total of 9 candidates registered with the Independent National Electoral Commission to contest in the election. APC candidate Adebayo Clement Adeyeye won the election, defeating PDP candidate Abiodun Olujumi and 7 other party candidates. Adebayo Clement Adeyeye received 58.78% of the votes, while Abiodun Olujumi received 40.69%.

Tribunal 
The National Assembly Election Petition Tribunal sitting in Ado Ekiti nullified the election of Senator Dayo Adeyeye, and declared Senator Abiodun Olujimi winner of the Ekiti South, February 2019 senatorial elections.

References 

Ekiti State senatorial elections
2019 Ekiti State elections
Ekiti State Senate elections